Antelope Township may refer to one of the following places in the United States:

 Antelope Township, Franklin County, Nebraska
 Antelope Township, Harlan County, Nebraska
 Antelope Township, Holt County, Nebraska
 Antelope Township, Perkins County, South Dakota

See also
 West Antelope Township, Benson County, North Dakota

Township name disambiguation pages